Kentucky Route 123 (KY 123) is a state highway in Kentucky. It runs from KY 307/KY 3061 in rural Hickman County east of Clinton to U.S. Route 51 (US 51) in Bardwell via Clinton and Columbus.

Major intersections

References

0123
Transportation in Hickman County, Kentucky
Transportation in Carlisle County, Kentucky